The 1971 World Championship Tennis circuit was one of the two rival professional male tennis circuits of 1971. It was organized by World Championship Tennis (WCT) and was the first edition of the circuit. Points were awarded to players based on their tournament results (ten points for the tournament winner, seven points for the runner–up, four points for the semifinalists, two points for the quarterfinalists and one point for reaching the second round). The circuit included twenty regular events and a WCT circuit final taking place in Houston/Dallas in November for the eight players with the highest points total. Each tournament had a minimum prize money of $50,000.

Overview

Schedule
The schedule of the tournaments on the 1971 WCT circuit, with player progression documented from the quarterfinals stage onward.

February

March

April

May

June

July

August

September

October

November

Standings

Key

Source: World of Tennis '72

See also
1971 Grand Prix circuit
Association of Tennis Professionals
International Tennis Federation

Notes

References

External links
Association of Tennis Professionals (ATP) official website
International Tennis Federation (ITF) official website

 
World Championship Tennis circuit seasons
World Championship Tennis